Thomas Essomba (born 2 December 1987) is a Cameroonian-British professional boxer who held the Commonwealth flyweight title from 2015 to 2017. As an amateur he represented Cameroon at the 2012 Olympics, reaching the round of 16 of the light-flyweight bracket.

Career
Essomba fought in two Olympic games for the Cameroon boxing team; at the 2012 Olympics in London, he was captain of the team and reached the last 16 of the light-flyweight division, being defeated by Paddy Barnes. He defected in London, was given political asylum and indefinite leave to remain in the United Kingdom, and became a British citizen soon after. He resettled in Sunderland, where he has trained at the Olympian Gym. In his professional career, he won the Commonwealth flyweight title in October 2015 and the English bantamweight title in March 2018.

Achievements
2019 WBA Continental bantamweight title
2018 English bantamweight title
2015 Commonwealth flyweight title
2015 International Masters Bronze super-flyweight title 
2012 Second Olympic participation, London, England
2012 Cameroon champion, best sportsman, first Cameroon Award.
2011 AIBA World Championship ranking: 20
2011 African Confederation ranking: 1
2009 AIBA World Championship participation in Milan.
2008 First Olympic participation, Beijing, China.

Professional boxing record

See also
Cameroon at the 2008 Summer Olympics#Boxing

References

External links

Data 
All Africa 2007
First qualifier results
2nd Qualifier

1987 births
Living people
Light-flyweight boxers
Olympic boxers of Cameroon
Commonwealth Games competitors for Cameroon
Boxers at the 2006 Commonwealth Games
Boxers at the 2008 Summer Olympics
Boxers at the 2012 Summer Olympics
Cameroonian male boxers
African Games gold medalists for Cameroon
African Games medalists in boxing
African Games bronze medalists for Cameroon
Competitors at the 2007 All-Africa Games
Competitors at the 2011 All-Africa Games